Cut to Impress is the debut studio album by American country music artist Maggie Rose. The album was released on March 26, 2013, via RPM Entertainment. It includes the singles "I Ain't Your Mama," "Better" and "Looking Back Now."

Content
Maggie Rose co-wrote four of the album's 10 tracks, including "Mostly Bad," which contains the lyric that the album was titled after. On naming the record Cut to Impress, Rose said that it was "a confident statement about all the cuts on the album, and it’s also is a statement saying I have cut out a place for myself as an artist that is different and unique."

"I Ain't Your Mama" was released as the album's lead-off single on June 25, 2012. The song reached a peak of number 38 on the U.S. Billboard Hot Country Songs chart, becoming her first Top 40 hit, and also peaked at number 29 on the Billboard Country Airplay chart. "Better" was released as the second single on February 25, 2013, and was another Top 30 hit on the Country Airplay chart. The album's third and final single, "Looking Back Now," was released on January 20, 2014, and reached a peak of number 46 on the Country Airplay chart.

Critical reception

Daryl Addison of GAC gave Cut to Impress a positive review and said that the album "more than lives up to its name with a unique blend of bluesy, R&B flavored country that is as sexy as it is fierce." He named "I Ain’t Your Mama," "I Know Better Now," "Looking Back Now," and "Better" the album's key tracks. Roughstock's Matt Bjorke found that the songs are "mostly tempo-driven with a couple of ballads mixed in", and vowed that "She has the talent, the looks, the drive and - most importantly - the songs that make her the complete package", which this allows Cut to Impress to be a "mighty impressive collection of songs." Steve Leggett of Allmusic proclaimed that Cut to Impress "does indeed impress, full of well-recorded, well-sung tracks that are poised to shine on contemporary country radio and yet cohere together in a solid sonic statement", which the albums sound is steady, and contains "forward mixed drums giving things a big sound and swampy electric guitars giving it some bite and snarl." Yet, Leggett said, "but it's Rose's singing that makes it all work, and at times she sounds like the second coming of Shania Twain", and he called "this one...fully formed and ready to go, and if Maggie Rose doesn't end up being a major contemporary country star, well, then the whole thing is rigged." Lastly, Leggett evoked that Rose "has a powerful and slightly blues-infused voice, blonde good looks, and the kind of sassy, playful, take-no-bullshit attitude that makes her performances stand out in a crowd, a kind of good girl next door who isn't a stranger to turning up the bad girl alter ego when the song demands it."

Track listing

Personnel
 Eddie Bayers - drums
 Mike Brignardello - bass guitar
 Cade Doyle - acoustic guitar
 Dan Dugmore - dobro, electric guitar, steel guitar
 Glen Duncan - fiddle
 Shannon Forrest - drums
 Kenny Greenberg - electric guitar
 David Grissom - electric guitar
 Tania Hancheroff - background vocals
 Aubrey Haynie - fiddle, mandolin
 Wes Hightower - background vocals
 Brent Mason - electric guitar
 Greg Morrow - drums
 Natalie Murphy - fiddle, background vocals
 Steve Nathan - keyboards, piano
 Billy Panda - acoustic guitar
 Maggie Rose - lead vocals, background vocals
 Raquel Shouse - bass guitar
 Sarah Tomek - drums, percussion
 Jason Waters - percussion, background vocals
 Biff Watson - acoustic guitar
 Raquel Wynn - background vocals

Chart performance

Album

Singles

References

2013 debut albums
Maggie Rose albums
Albums produced by James Stroud
Albums produced by Blake Chancey